HNLMS Witte de With was an , named after the 17th-century Dutch admiral of the same name. She served during World War II.

Service history
The ship was laid down on 28 May 1927, at the shipyard of Feijenoord, in Rotterdam, and launched on 11 September 1928. The ship was commissioned on 20 February 1930.

On 16 November 1935, Witte de With, her sister , and the cruiser , made a visit to Saigon.

Later that year on 13 November, both s and the destroyers , Witte de With, and Piet Hein, made a fleet visit to Singapore. Before the visit they had practiced in the South China Sea.

World War II
The ship took part in the Battle of the Java Sea on 27 February 1942.  was damaged in the battle and escorted back to Soerabaja by Witte de With. A few days later Witte de With was attacked and damaged by Japanese planes on 1 March 1942. The next day she was scuttled.

References

 

Admiralen-class destroyers
Ships built in Schiedam
1928 ships
World War II destroyers of the Netherlands
World War II shipwrecks in the Pacific Ocean
Destroyers sunk by aircraft
Maritime incidents in March 1942
Ships sunk by Japanese aircraft
Scuttled vessels